Sacchi is an Italian surname. Notable people with the surname include:

Ada Sacchi Simonetta (1874–1944), Italian librarian and women's rights activist
Andrea Sacchi (1599–1661), Italian Baroque painter
Antonio Sacchi (died 1694), Italian Baroque painter
Antonio Sacchi (died 1694), Italian painter of the Baroque period
Arrigo Sacchi (born 1946), Italian footballer and manager
Bartolomeo Sacchi (1421–1481), known as Bartolomeo Platina, Italian Renaissance humanist writer and gastronomist
Bruno Sacchi (1931-2011), Italian architect and collaborator of Giovanni Michelucci
Carlo Sacchi (1617–1706), Italian Baroque painter
Chiara Sacchi (born 2002), Argentinian climate activist 
Donatella Sacchi (born 1959), Italian gymnast
Enzo Sacchi (1926–1988), Italian cyclist
Ettore Sacchi (1851–1924), Italian lawyer and politician
Fabio Sacchi (born 1974), Italian cyclist
Fabrizia Sacchi (born 1971), Italian actress
Federico Sacchi (born 1936), Argentine footballer
Floraleda Sacchi (born 1978), Italian musician
Francesca Sacchi Tommasi, independent Italian art dealer
Franco Sacchi, Italian filmmaker and editor
Gasparo Sacchi, Italian Renaissance painter
Giuseppe Sacchi, Italian Baroque painter
Louise Sacchi (1913–1997), American aviator and writer
Luca Sacchi (born 1968), Italian swimmer, nephew of Mara
Luigi Sacchi (1805–1861), Italian painter, wood engraver and photographer
Mara Sacchi (born 1948), Italian swimmer
Marietta Sacchi, Italian opera singer
Massimo Sacchi (born 1950), Italian former swimmer
Nicoletta Sacchi (born 1949), Italian professor of oncology
Pier Francesco Sacchi, Italian Renaissance painter
Renato Sacchi (1928–2020), Italian former sports shooter
Robert Sacchi (1932–2021), American actor
Tommaso Sacchi (born 1983), Italian politician

Italian-language surnames